Eunidia caffra is a species of beetle in the family Cerambycidae. It was described by Fahraeus in 1872.

Subspecies
 Eunidia caffra caffra Fahraeus, 1872
 Eunidia caffra socia Gahan, 1909

References

Eunidiini
Beetles described in 1872